The 1982–83 Athenian League season was the 60th in the history of Athenian League. The league consisted of 20 teams.

Clubs
The league joined 4 new teams:
 Camberley Town, relegated from Isthmian League Division Two
 Newbury Town, from Hellenic League Premier Division
 Thatcham Town, from Hellenic League Division One
 Flackwell Heath, from Hellenic League Premier Division

League table

References

1982–83 in English football leagues
Athenian League